Benny Baker (born Benjamin Michael Zifkin; May 5, 1907 – September 20, 1994) was an American film and theater actor and comedian, and appeared in over 50 films between 1934 and 1988. He died in Woodland Hills, Los Angeles, California.

Filmography

Films

The Hell Cat (1934) as Snapper Dugan
Belle of the Nineties (1934) as Blackie
A Wicked Woman (1934) (uncredited)
Love in Bloom (1935) as Man who buys radio
College Scandal (1935) as 'Cuffie' Lewis
Annapolis Farewell (1935) as Zimmer
Wanderer of the Wasteland (1935) as Piano player
The Big Broadcast of 1936 (1935) as Herman
Thanks a Million (1935) as Tammany
Millions in the Air (1935) as Benny
Rose of the Rancho (1936) as Hill-Billy Boy
Drift Fence (1936) as Jim Traft
Give Us This Night (1936) as Tomasso
Panic on the Air (1936) as Andy
Lady Be Careful (1936) as Barney
Murder with Pictures (1936) as Phil Doane
Rose Bowl (1936) as Dutch Schultz
Mind Your Own Business (1936) as Sparrow
Champagne Waltz (1937) as Flip
The Crime Nobody Saw (1937) as Horace Dryden
Hotel Haywire (1937) as Bertie Sterns
Wild Money (1937) as Al Vogel
Blonde Trouble (1937) as Maxie Schwartz
Double or Nothing (1937) as Sailor
That Navy Spirit (1937) as Stuffy Miller
Love on Toast (1937) as Egbert
Tip-Off Girls (1937) as Scotty
Touchdown, Army (1938) as Cadet Dick Mycroft
His Exciting Night (1938) as Taxicab Driver
She Married a Cop (1939) as Sidney
Dancing Co-Ed (1939) as Chief Evans (uncredited)
The Farmer's Daughter (1940) as Monk Gordon
Sing for Your Supper (1941) as William
Captains of the Clouds (1942) as Popcorn Kearns
Stage Door Canteen (1942) as Beny Baker
Up in Arms (1944) as Butterball
Joe Palooka in the Knockout (1947) as Looie
My Girl Tisa (1948) as Herman
Smart Woman (1948) as Junior - Photographer (uncredited)
Jinx Money (1948) as Augie Pollack
The Babe Ruth Story (1948) as Player (uncredited)
Homicide for Three (1948) as Timothy - Cab Driver 
Rose of the Yukon (1949) as Jack Wells
Joe Palooka in the Big Fight (1949) as Fight Secretary
Manhattan Angel (1949) as Aloysius Duff
Manhandled (1949) as Boyd, Man in Apartment House Lobby with Girl (uncredited)
The Inspector General (1949) as Telecki (uncredited)
Loan Shark (1952) as Tubby
Young Man with Ideas (1952) as Bill Collector
Models Inc. (1952) as Freddy
Feudin' Fools (1952) as Corky
Somebody Loves Me (1952) as Musician (uncredited)
Thunderbirds (1952) as Pvt. Charles Klassen
Public Pigeon No. 1 (1957) as Frankie Frannis
No Time for Sergeants (1958) as Capt. Jim Able (uncredited)
Papa's Delicate Condition (1963) as Douglas
For Those Who Think Young (1964) as Lou
Boy, Did I Get a Wrong Number! (1966) as Detective Lt. Schwartz
The Wicked Dreams of Paula Schultz (1968) as Cab Driver
Some Kind of a Nut (1969) as The Cabbie (as Ben Baker)
Paint Your Wagon (1969) as Haywood Holbrook (as Ben Baker)
Scandalous John (1971) as Dr. Kropak (as Ben Baker)
Jory as Frank Jordan (as Ben Baker)
The Sting II (1983) as Pyle
Kidco (1984) as Judge Willoughby
The Longshot (1986) as Mr. Hooper
Monster in the Closet (1987) as Mr. McGinty
18 Again! (1988) as Red

Short films
School for Romance (1934) as Male student (uncredited)
When Do We Eat (1934) as Showalski 
I'll Be Suing You (1934) as Building Repairman
Three Chumps Ahead (1934) as Benny Baker, Second Suitor
You Said A Hatful! (1934) as Train Engineer (uncredited)
The Ballad of Paducah Jail (1934) as Reporter Outside Jail
You Bring the Ducks (1934) as Nephew
Radio Take It Away (1947)) as Radio Program Emcee
Birch Street Gym (1991) as Nate

Television

Kraft Theater (1955)
Studio One (1955) as Harvey
The Milton Berle Show (1956)NBC Matinee Theater (1956)
Playhouse 90 (1956)
General Electric Theater (1957)
The Life of Riley (1957) as Lambert
The George Burns and Gracie Allen Show (1957) as Mr. Syms
Maverick (1957) as Mike Brill
The Real McCoys (1957) as Mr. Feeley
The Thin Man (1957) as Curly Bascom
Leave It to Beaver (1957) as Barber
M Squad (1958) as Dutch
Colt .45 (1958) as Bartender/Hotel Clerk
The Red Skelton Hour (1957-1958) as L. G. Heath Jr./Sir Lancelot
Sugarfoot (1958) as Irving
Alfred Hitchcock Presents (1958) as Al - Bartender
Man Without a Gun (1958) as Phil
The People's Choice (1958) as Harry Bailey
The Silent Service (1957-1958) as Mayhew the Cook/Heinz
The Bob Cummings Show (1958) as Hafter's Stooge
Schlitz Playhouse (1957-1958) as Regal Hotel Receptionist/Henry, cafe proprietor
Lawman (1961) as Dave the Bartender
Surfside 6 (1961) as Joe/Walter/Harry
Hawaiian Eye (1961) as Jake
Room for One More (1962) as Jedson
McKeever and the Colonel (1962) as Mr. Anderson
Cheyenne (1957-1962) as Barber/Doc Johnson/Tulliver
The Jack Benny Program (1963) as Herbie
The Danny Thomas Show (1958-1963) as Mailman/Mr. Foster/Poker Player
77 Sunset Strip (1958-1963) as Maxie Tuttle/Doctor/Fred Webber
The Farmer's Daughter (TV series) (1964)
The Cara Williams Show (1964) as Grady
Broadside (1965) as Charlie Leff
Hank (1965) as Bakery Man
Perry Mason (1963-1965) as Jerry Ormond/Jerome Bentley/John Flickinger
F Troop (1965-1966) as Pete/Pete (Bartender)
Love on a Rooftop (1966) 
Felony Squad (1967) as Cab driver
The Bill Cosby Show (1970) as Mr. Apollo
Ironside (1970) as Counterman
Julia (1971) as Mr. Greenburg
Green Acres (1971) as Bert Beamish
Charlie's Angels (1977) as Murphy Myrphy
The Love Boat (1978) as Grandad 'Jack Daniels'
Kojak (1978) as Danny Fogarty
Laverne & Shirley (1981) as Reverend Ernie
Cagney & Lacey (1983) as Wally
Goodnight, Beantown (1983) 
Trapper John, M.D. (1984) as Fred Romanis
He's the Mayor (1986) as Benny
Sledge Hammer! (1987) as Ice Cream Truck Driver
The Bronx Zoo (1987) as Gideon
Beauty and the Beast (1987) as Herman
Out of This World (1988) as Old Man

References

External links
 

1907 births
1994 deaths
20th-century American male actors
American male film actors